The 2022 Texas elections were held on November 8, 2022. Primary elections were held on March 1, with runoffs held on May 24 for primary candidates who did not receive a majority of the vote.

All of the states' executive offices were up for election, as well as all seats of the Texas Legislature and all thirty-eight seats in the United States House of Representatives, two of which were apportioned to the state following the 2020 redistricting cycle based on data from the 2020 census.

Federal

United States House of Representatives

Executive

Governor 

Incumbent Republican Governor Greg Abbott ran for re-election to a third term. He was re-elected in 2018 with 55.8% of the vote.

Abbott faced a number of Republican challengers, including former party chair and ex-Florida congressman Allen West, former state senator Don Huffines, and political commentator Chad Prather, all of which have been vocal critics of Abbott due to his handling of the COVID-19 pandemic in Texas. Former U.S. Representative and 2018 U.S. Senate nominee Beto O'Rourke won the Democratic primary.

Lieutenant Governor 

Incumbent Republican Lieutenant Governor Dan Patrick ran for re-election to a third term. He was re-elected in 2018 with 51.3% of the vote.

Republican candidates include activist Trayce Bradford and secessionist Daniel Miller Democratic candidates included 2018 nominee  Mike Collier and state representative Michelle Beckley.

Attorney General 

Incumbent Republican Attorney General Ken Paxton ran for re-election to a third term. He was re-elected in 2018 with 50.6% of the vote.

Paxton was challenged by Land Commissioner George P. Bush, former Texas Supreme Court Justice Eva Guzman, and U.S. Representative Louie Gohmert in the Republican primary. Former Galveston mayor Joe Jaworski, Attorney Lee Merritt who dropped out and endorsed eventual primary nominee, ACLU attorney Rochelle Garza, were running in the Democratic primary.

Comptroller of Public Accounts 

Incumbent Republican Comptroller Glenn Hegar ran for re-election to a third term. He was re-elected in 2018 with 53.2% of the vote.

Hegar's sole Republican challenger was businessman Mark Golby. Accountant Janet Dudding, attorney Tim Mahoney, and strategist Angel Luis Vega ran for the Democratic nomination.

Commissioner of the General Land Office 

Incumbent Republican Land Commissioner George P. Bush retired to run for attorney general. He was re-elected in 2018 with 53.7% of the vote. He was replaced by fellow Republican Dawn Buckingham, who won with 56.2% of the vote.

Republican primary

Candidates 
 Dawn Buckingham, state senator from the 24th district

Eliminated in runoff
 Tim Westley, pastor

Eliminated in primary
 Ben Armenta, businessman
 Victor Avila, former U.S. Immigration and Customs Enforcement agent
 Rufus Lopez, attorney
 Weston Martinez, activist and former Texas Real Estate Commissioner
 Don W. Minton, attorney

Endorsements

Polling

Results

Runoff polling

Runoff results

Democratic primary

Candidates 
 Jay Kleberg, conservationist and member of the King Ranch family

Eliminated in runoff
 Sandagrace Martinez, mental health advocate

Eliminated in primary
 Jinny Suh, lawyer and activist
 Michael Lange, investment manager

Endorsements

Polling

Results

Runoff results

General election

Polling

Results

Commissioner of Agriculture 

Incumbent Republican Agriculture Commissioner Sid Miller ran for re-election to a third term. He was re-elected in 2018 with 51.3% of the vote.
He was re-elected for a 3rd term with 56.4% of the vote.

Republican primary

Candidates 
 Sid Miller, incumbent agriculture commissioner

Eliminated in primary
 Carey A. Counsil, professor and rancher
 James White, state representative from the 19th district

Polling

Results

Democratic primary

Candidates 
 Susan Hays, cannabis attorney

Eliminated in primary
 Ed Ireson, businessman

Endorsements

Polling

Results

General election

Polling

Results

Railroad Commission 

Incumbent Republican Railroad Commissioner Wayne Christian ran for re-election to a second six-year term. He was first elected in 2016 with 53.1% of the vote. He was successfully re-elected with 55.4% of the vote.

Republican primary

Candidates 
 Wayne Christian, incumbent railroad commissioner

Eliminated in runoff
 Sarah Stogner, attorney

Eliminated in primary
 Marvin Summers, lawyer
 Dawayne Tipton, project manager
 Tom Slocum Jr., engineering consultant

Endorsements

Polling

Results

Runoff

Polling

Results

Democratic primary

Candidates 
 Luke Warford, former staffer for the Texas Democratic Party

Results

Libertarian convention

Candidates 
Jaime Diez

Green convention

Candidates 
Hunter Crow

General election

Polling

Results

Judicial

Supreme Court 
Three of the nine positions of the Supreme Court of Texas are up for election. Justices are elected to six-year renewable terms with no term limit.

Place 3 
Incumbent Republican Justice Debra Lehrmann is running for re-election to a third term. She was re-elected in 2016 with 53.1% of the vote.

Republican primary

Candidates 
 Debra Lehrmann, incumbent Associate Justice of the Texas Supreme Court

Results

Democratic primary

Candidates 
Erin A. Nowell, incumbent Associate Justice of the Fifth Court of Appeals of Texas

Results

General election

Results

Place 5 
Incumbent Republican Justice Rebeca Huddle is running for election to a full term. She was appointed by Greg Abbott in 2020 to replace retiring Justice Paul W. Green.

Republican primary

Candidates 
 Rebeca Huddle, incumbent Associate Justice of the Texas Supreme Court and former Associate Justice of the First Court of Appeals of Texas

Results

Democratic primary

Candidates 
Amanda Reichek, incumbent Associate Justice of the Fifth Court of Appeals of Texas

Results

General election

Results

Place 9 
Incumbent Republican Justice Evan A. Young is running for election to a full term. He was appointed by Greg Abbott in 2021 to replace Justice Eva Guzman, who retired to run for attorney general.

Republican primary

Candidates 
 David Schenck, incumbent Associate Justice of the Fifth Court of Appeals of Texas
 Evan A. Young, incumbent Associate Justice of the Texas Supreme Court

Results

Democratic primary

Candidates 
Julia Maldonado, Harris County district judge

Results

General election

Results

Court of Criminal Appeals 
Three of the nine positions of the Texas Court of Criminal Appeals are up for election. Justices are elected to six-year renewable terms with no term limit.

Place 2 
Incumbent Republican Judge Mary Lou Keel is running for re-election to a second term. She was first elected in 2016 with 54.9% of the vote.

Republican primary

Candidates 
 Mary Lou Keel, incumbent Judge of the Texas Court of Criminal Appeals

Results

General election

Results

Place 5 
Incumbent Republican Judge Scott Walker ran for re-election to a second term. He was first elected in 2016 with 54.7% of the vote. Walker defeated Democratic opponent Dana Huffman, winning a second term with 57% of the vote.

Republican primary

Candidates 
 Clint Morgan, prosecutor
 Scott Walker, incumbent Judge of the Texas Criminal Court of Appeals

Results

Democratic primary

Candidates 
Dana Huffman, attorney

Results

General election

Results

Place 6 
Incumbent Republican Judge Jesse McClure is running for election to a full term. He was appointed by Greg Abbott in 2021 to replace Michael Keasler, who reached mandatory retirement when he turned 75 years old in 2017.

Republican primary

Candidates 
 Jesse McClure, incumbent Judge of the Texas Criminal Court of Appeals

Results

Democratic primary

Candidates 
Robert Johnson, Harris County district judge

Results

General election

Results

Board of Education 
All fifteen seats of the Texas Board of Education are up for election to four-year terms. The board follows a 2-4-4 term system; members are elected to two-year terms at the beginning of each decade. Prior to the election, the board was made up of nine Republicans and six Democrats.

District 1

Republican primary

Democratic primary

General election

District 2

Republican primary

Democratic primary

General election

Member, District 3

Republican primary

Democratic primary

General election

Member, District 4

Democratic primary

General election

Member, District 5

Republican primary

Democratic primary

General election

Member, District 6

Republican primary

Democratic primary

General election

Legislature

Senate 

All 31 seats of the Texas Senate are up for election to two-year terms. Prior to the election, Republicans hold a majority of 18 seats against the Democrats' 13 seats.

House of Representatives 

All 150 seats of the Texas House of Representatives are up for election to two-year terms. Prior to the election, Republicans hold a majority of 85 seats against the Democrats' 65 seats.

See also 
 2022 United States elections

Notes 

Partisan clients

References

External links 
Official campaign websites for Comptroller candidates
Mark Goloby (R) for Comptroller
Glenn Hegar (R) for Comptroller
Angel Luis Vega (D) for Comptroller

Official campaign websites for Land Commissioner candidates
Ben Armenta (R) for Land Commissioner
Dawn Buckingham (R) for Land Commissioner
Jay Kleberg (D) for Land Commissioner
Weston Martinez (R) for Land Commissioner
Don W. Minton (R) for Land Commissioner
Jon Spiers (R) for Land Commissioner
Jinny Suh (D) for Land Commissioner
Tim Westley (R) for Land Commissioner

Official campaign websites for Agriculture Commissioner candidates
Carey A. Counsil (R) for Agriculture Commissioner
Susan Hays (D) for Agriculture Commissioner
Ed Ireson (D) for Agriculture Commissioner
Sid Miller (R) for Agriculture Commissioner
James White (R) for Agriculture Commissioner

Official campaign websites for Railroad Commissioner candidates
Wayne Christian (R) for Railroad Commissioner
Luke Warford (D) for Railroad Commissioner

Official campaign websites for Supreme Court candidates
Rebeca Huddle (R) for Supreme Court
Debra Lehrmann (R) for Supreme Court
Julia Maldonado (D) for Supreme Court
Erin Nowell (D) for Supreme Court
Amanda Reichek (D) for Supreme Court

Official campaign websites for Court of Criminal Appeals candidates
Dana Huffman (D) for Court of Criminal Appeals
Mary Lou Keel (R) for Court of Criminal Appeals
Jesse McClure (R) for Court of Criminal Appeals
Clint Morgan (R) for Court of Criminal Appeals
Scott Walker (R) for Court of Criminal Appeals

 
Texas